The  2017 Big 12 Championship Game was a college football game played on Saturday, December 2, 2017, at AT&T Stadium, in Arlington. This was the 16th Big 12 Championship Game and determined the 2017 champion of the Big 12 Conference. This was the first year of the current division-less format of the game; instead of representatives from two divisions, the two teams with the best conference records earned a spot in the game. The game featured the top-seeded, Oklahoma Sooners and the second-seeded, TCU Horned Frogs.

Background
In the 2010 Big 12 Championship Game, the South Division was represented by Oklahoma and the North Division was represented by Nebraska. Oklahoma defeated Nebraska, 23–20, to claim their seventh Big 12 title.

The 2010–2013 realignment of the conference left the Big 12 with ten members, and NCAA regulations at the time required a conference to have at least 12 members in order to hold an "exempt" championship game that did not count against the limit of 12 regular-season contests for FBS teams. The Big 12 thus used its regular season in-conference results to determine the conference champion.

Following a January 2016 NCAA rule change that allows FBS conferences to conduct exempt football championship games regardless of their membership numbers, the Big 12 announced that the championship game would be reinstated in 2017.

Teams

TCU

Oklahoma

Game summary

Statistics

References

External links
 Game statistics at statbroadcast.com

Big 12 Championship Game
Big 12 Championship Game
Oklahoma Sooners football games
TCU Horned Frogs football games
American football in the Dallas–Fort Worth metroplex
Big 12 Championship Game
Big 12 Championship Game